Senator Rogers may refer to:

B. H. "Johnny" Rogers (1905–1977), Louisiana State Senate
Charles Cassius Rogers (1849–1937), Wisconsin State Senate
Chip Rogers (born 1968), Georgia State Senate
Daniel Rogers (politician) (1754–1806), Delaware State Senate
Earline S. Rogers (born 1934), Indiana State Senate
George F. Rogers (1887–1948), New York State Senate
George Rogers (Massachusetts politician) (born 1933), Massachusetts State Senate
John Sill Rogers (1796–1860), Connecticut State Senate
Lynn Rogers (politician) (born 1958), Kansas State Senate
Mike Rogers (Michigan politician) (born 1963), Michigan State Senate
Richard Dean Rogers (1921–2016), Kansas State Senate
Samuel St. George Rogers (1832–1880), Florida State Senate
Sherman S. Rogers (1830–1900), New York State Senate
Thomas Jones Rogers (1781–1832), Pennsylvania State Senate

See also
Senator Rodgers (disambiguation)